Ole Krarup (17 March 1935 – 7 October 2017) was a Danish EU politician and former professor of law at the University of Copenhagen.

Political career
From 1994 through 2006 he was Member of the European Parliament with the Folkebevægelsen mod EU (People's Movement against the EU), Member of the Bureau of the European United Left - Nordic Green Left and sat on
the European Parliament's Committee on Civil Liberties, Justice and Home Affairs and its Committee on Budgetary Control. Krarup was a substitute for the Committee on Constitutional Affairs and a member of the
Delegation for relations with South Africa.

Krarup resigned as an MEP on 1 January 2007 due to medical consequences after a traffic accident while riding his bicycle in Strasbourg in 2006. He was succeeded by MEP Søren Bo Søndergaard.

Death
Krarup died on 7 October 2017 at the age of 82.

References

External links
 
 
 

1935 births
2017 deaths
People's Movement against the EU MEPs
MEPs for Denmark 1994–1999
MEPs for Denmark 1999–2004
MEPs for Denmark 2004–2009
Euroscepticism in Denmark
People from Aarhus